Frederick "Fred" Rudolph Wills (18 September 1928 – 1992) was the Minister of Foreign Affairs of Guyana from 1975 to 1978. He was a renowned statesman, lawyer, cricket expert and intellectual. Wills is cited for his intellectual and academic genius by oral stories from his fellow-Guyanese and globally.

Education and career in England 
Fred Wills studied law at King's College London, where he was awarded the Jelf Medal for his outstanding academic success as a law graduate. He was also named to Queen's Counsel, the highest level of judges in England. However, he never practiced as a judge in England, instead returning to Guyana.

Return to Guyana 
When he returned to Guyana he became famous for being one of the top legal minds in Guyana, whilst also contributing to developing the law and constitution in Guyana.   When the Guyanese president Forbes Burnham came into power he appointed Wills as Justice Minister and later Foreign Affairs Minister. In that capacity Wills briefly presided over the United Nations Security Council and twice addressed the General Assembly, once on independence for East Timor and once on September 27, 1976, to promote a Third World debt moratorium.

Move to the United States 
Wills's government service ended in 1978 and he moved to the United States. There he became a professor at Rutgers University in New Jersey and an associate of Lyndon LaRouche. He was a founding board member of the Schiller Institute in 1984.

Personal life 
Fred Wills was married to Doris Harper-Wills whom he divorced and later remarried. He served as club captain for the Demerara Cricket Club (DCC) in Georgetown, Guyana, and was a popular radio announcer at cricket games and for the programme 'Fred Wills on Sport' transmitted in the Caribbean region .In the U.S. Guyanese cricket fans have proposed renaming the DCC Pavilion as Fred Wills Pavilion.

He died in New Jersey in 1992.

References

External links 
Schiller Institute article: "Colombo, Sri Lanka, 1976: When a New Just Monetary System Was On The Agenda". The story of Fred Wills's second U.N. speech.
Caribbean Cricket: mention of Wills's cricket skill

1928 births
1992 deaths
20th-century Guyanese lawyers
LaRouche movement
Foreign ministers of Guyana
Government ministers of Guyana
Alumni of King's College London
Guyanese emigrants to the United States